Lonesome Day Records is an independent record label founded by Randall Deaton based in Booneville, Kentucky that supports bluegrass and country bands.

History
Founder Randall Deaton started the Lonesome Day label in 2002, and released their first recordings in 2004. He named the label after the Bruce Springsteen song "Lonesome Day."

In 2013, Jeff Carter, a musician and co-founder of Via Media, purchased a minority shareholder stake in Lonesome Day, providing marketing experience and short term financing as required.

Also in 2013, Lonesome Day Records began a collaborative relationship with Rock House Entertainment, a company providing booking, publicity, media assistance, and management services for bluegrass bands.

In 2014, Lonesome Day Records launched a spinoff label, Dry Lightning Records that focused on Americana artists. Lonesome Day continued to release albums by its roster of bluegrass artists.

Artists
Here is a partial list of artists who have released recordings on the Lonesome Day label.
 Rick Bartley
 Richard Bennett
 Blue Moon Rising
 The Boohers
 Sarah Borges
 Jeff Clair
 Larry Cordle and Lonesome Standard Time
 Fred Eaglesmith
 The Fabulous Ginn Sisters
 Ward Hayden and The Outliers (prior to 2015)
 Steve Gulley
 Randy Kohrs
 Julie Neumark
 Jeff Parker
 Lou Reid and Carolina
 Ralph Stanley II
 Ernie Thacker
 Darrell Webb
 Wildfire
 Sam Wilson

See also 
 List of record labels

References

External links
 

American record labels
American independent record labels
Companies based in Kentucky
Folk record labels
Record labels established in 2002
Owsley County, Kentucky